The 1985 World Marathon Cup was the first edition of the World Marathon Cup of athletics and were held in Hiroshima, Japan.

Results

Men

Women

References

Results
IAAF World Marathon Cup Results Men. Association of Road Racing Statisticians. Retrieved 2018-03-22.
IAAF World Marathon Cup Results Women. Association of Road Racing Statisticians. Retrieved 2018-03-22.

External links
 Copa del Mundo de marathon en Hiroshima

World Marathon Cup
World Cup
World Marathon Cup
Marathons in Japan
International athletics competitions hosted by Japan